George Cornelius (12 August 1874 – 7 July 1966) was an Australian rules footballer who played with South Melbourne and Carlton in the Victorian Football League (VFL).

Notes

External links 

George Cornelius's profile at Blueseum

1874 births
1966 deaths
Australian rules footballers from Melbourne
Sydney Swans players
Carlton Football Club players
People from South Melbourne